Gornje Ratkovo  is a village in the municipalities of Ribnik, Republika Srpska and Ključ.

Demographics 
According to the 2013 census, its population was 235, all living in Ribnik and none in the Ključ part.

References

Populated places in Ključ
Populated places in Ribnik